Tamu Lhosar is a new year festival of Gurung people of Nepal. It is celebrated on every 15th Poush (December/January) of the Nepali calendar. Similar to other Lhosars, the Gurung people also represents the years with a cycle of  12 years representing various creatures (garuda, serpent, horse, sheep, monkey, bird, dog, deer, mouse, cow, tiger and cat).

Activities
In the festival, the Gurung men wear Bhangra, a white apron and a Kachhad, a short. Gurung women, both children and adolescents, wear Ghalek, a velvet blouses and gold ornaments such as earrings and semi-precious stone necklaces.

People in small and large groups feast during the festival and perform traditional dances. Home-made Raksi is served during the feast.

It's a public holiday in Nepal on Tamu Losar day.

See also
Gyalpo Lhosar, new year of Sherpa people
Sonam Lhosar, new year of Tamang people
Lhosar, new year of Tibet

References

External links
Photos of festival

Festivals in Nepal
New Year celebrations
Buddhist festivals in Nepal
Buddhist festivals in India
New Year in India
Gurung culture